The Matra Super 530 is a French short to medium-range air-to-air missile. The Super 530 series is an improved type of the R.530 missile.

Super 530F is carried on the Dassault Mirage F1. It was introduced in 1979.
Super 530D is carried on the Dassault-Breguet Mirage 2000. It was introduced in 1988.

The Super 530F and Super 530D share the same general aerodynamic features and internal layout with cruciform low aspect ratio wings, cruciform aft controls, and 30 kg high explosive fragmentation warhead. However the 530D has a lengthened stainless steel body. This allows it to accommodate a more powerful dual-thrust solid propellant motor and a new seeker assembly. The new seeker includes doppler filtering for improved low altitude performance and digital micro-processing to enable the seeker to be reprogrammed against new threats.

The missile has a range of 40 km and a maximum speed of less than Mach 5.

The Super 530 is being replaced by the MICA missile.

Operational service
During the Iran-Iraq War, the Iraqi Air Force used Super 530F missiles on their Mirage F1s against Iran.

On 14 September 1983, in an incident that was revealed thirty years later, two Turkish F-100Fs violated Iraqi airspace and one was shot down by an Iraqi Mirage F1EQ firing a Super 530F missile. The Turkish pilots survived and returned to Turkey.

On 15 July 2019, during a police operation in Northern Italy, a functioning Super 530F missile was seized together with firearms. The missile lacked the warhead. The weapons were smuggled by a group of people connected to far-right movements. The missile canister indicated it was originally sold to the Qatari armed forces. The original contract date with Qatar was October 1980.

A Super 530 missile with a live warhead was discovered at Florida's Lakeland Linder International Airport on 14 August 2020 and had to be removed by explosive ordnance disposal specialists from the U.S. Air Force's 6th Civil Engineering Squadron at nearby MacDill Air Force Base.  The missile had been inadvertently shipped to the U.S. defense contractor, Draken International, LLC, an airport tenant.

Operators

Current operators

Former operators

 Super 530F

 Libya

Similar weapons
 AIM-7 Sparrow
 R-23 (missile)
 R-27 (air-to-air missile)

References

Super 530
Matra
Military equipment introduced in the 1970s